Crook is another name for criminal.
 
Crook or Crooks may also refer to:

Places 

 Crook, County Durham, England, a town
 Crook, Cumbria, England, village and civil parish
 Crook Hill, Derbyshire, England
 Crook, Colorado, United States, a Statutory Town
 Crook Township, Hamilton County, Illinois, United States
 Crooks Township, Renville County, Minnesota, United States
 Crook, Missouri, an unincorporated community
 Crook County, Oregon, United States
 Crook County, Wyoming, United States
 Crook City, South Dakota, United States, a populated place also known as Crook
 Crooks, South Dakota, United States, a city
 Crook National Forest, Arizona, United States, divided into three other national forests in 1953
 Crook Glacier, Oregon, United States
 Crooks Mound, an archaeological site in Louisiana, United States
 Crooks Inlet, Nunavut, Canada
 Fort Crook (disambiguation)

Surnames 
 Crook (surname)
 Crooks (surname)

Films
 The Crook, English title of Le voyou, a 1971 French movie
 Crook (film), a 2010 Hindi thriller film
 C(r)ook, a 2004 Austrian film

Other uses  
 A bocal, the mouthpiece of a woodwind instrument
 Crook (music), exchangeable section of a brass instrument
 Crook, the crozier carried by a bishop or abbot
 Shepherd's crook
 An angled stem used in securing a laid Devon hedge
 Baron Crook, a title in the Peerage of the United Kingdom
 Crook Hall, a former Roman Catholic seminary near Consett, County Durham
 Crook Inn, an inn in the Scottish Borders
 Crooks Covered Bridge, southeast of Rockville, Indiana, United States, on the National Register of Historic Places
 Crook Hall, Durham, a grade I listed house in Framwelgate, Durham

See also 
 
 Crooked (disambiguation)
 Crookes (disambiguation)